Kevin Tyree Dyson (born June 23, 1975) is a former American football wide receiver of the National Football League. He was drafted by the Tennessee Oilers 16th overall in the 1998 NFL Draft. He played college football at Utah.

Dyson is best known for his part in two historic NFL plays – the Music City Miracle and The Tackle. Kevin Dyson and his brother Andre Dyson were the first brothers in NFL history to score touchdowns in the same game.

After his football career ended, Dyson earned two master's degrees and a doctorate, and became the principal of a middle school, then a high school.

Early life and college
Born in Logan, Utah,  Dyson graduated in 1993 from Clearfield High School in Clearfield, Utah. In the fall of his senior year, he helped his team win the 1992 State 4A championship.

At the University of Utah, Dyson played on the Utah Utes football team for five seasons (1993–1997) and graduated in 1997 with a Bachelor of Science in sociology.  In his four seasons as a starter, Dyson caught 192 passes for 2,726 yards and 18 touchdowns.

Professional football career

Dyson played for the Tennessee Titans from 1998 to 2002, wearing #87. In the 1999 playoffs, he was involved in two of the most memorable plays in NFL history. Dyson was the recipient of Frank Wycheck's lateral known by many as the Music City Miracle, and he was tackled by Mike Jones "one yard short" of scoring the probable game-tying touchdown as time expired in Super Bowl XXXIV, in a play known as The Tackle.

Dyson played for the Carolina Panthers in 2003 but saw very little action due to injury. He did appear briefly in Super Bowl XXXVIII. The San Diego Chargers acquired Dyson for the 2004 season, but later released him. In 2005 he signed with the Washington Redskins but was cut on September 3 when teams reduced their rosters to the final 53 players. He finished his 6 NFL seasons with 178 receptions for 2,325 yards and 18 touchdowns in 59 regular-season games.

NFL career statistics

Coaching and education career
After retiring from football, Dyson went on to earn a Master of Education degree from Trevecca Nazarene University in 2007, and followed that up with a doctorate from the same school.

Dyson was a counselor and wide receiver coach at Glencliff Comprehensive High School in Nashville from 2007 to 2009. Since 2008, Dyson has been on the board of the organization Students Taking A Right Stand. He later left to serve as the receivers and backs coach for Independence High School at Thompson's Station, Tennessee as well as the athletic director, eventually ascending to head coach in 2010. Dyson served as an assistant principal at Independence High School and as the principal of Grassland Middle School in Franklin, Tennessee. On April 22, 2021, he was named principal at Centennial High School in Franklin.

Personal life
Dyson is the older brother of NFL cornerback and former Titans teammate Andre Dyson. He lived in Nashville and Salt Lake City during his football career.

References

1975 births
Living people
American football wide receivers
Carolina Panthers players
Utah Utes football players
Tennessee Oilers players
Tennessee Titans players
Trevecca Nazarene University alumni
People from Davis County, Utah
Sportspeople from Logan, Utah
Sportspeople from Salt Lake City
Players of American football from Salt Lake City
High school football coaches in Tennessee
African-American coaches of American football
African-American players of American football
21st-century African-American sportspeople
20th-century African-American sportspeople
Ed Block Courage Award recipients